Indolyrocephalus is an extinct genus of prehistoric amphibian.

See also
 Prehistoric amphibian
 List of prehistoric amphibians

Prehistoric amphibians